Pont-à-Vendin is a commune in the Pas-de-Calais department in the Hauts-de-France region of France.

Geography
The commune was important during the Middle Ages, as the Deûle river is bridged here.

Population

Places of interest
 The eighteenth century church of St. Vaast, rebuilt along with most of the town, after the First World War.
 The German war cemetery.
 The war memorial.

See also
Communes of the Pas-de-Calais department

References

External links

 War memorial website 
 Website of the Communaupole de Lens-Liévin 

Pontavendin
French Flanders